The Uttaradhi Arora literally the Northern Aroras, are a major subgroup of the Arora caste in India. After the conquest of Aror by the Arabs, the Aroras that went back North, towards Lahore, are called Uttaradhi Arora. Uttaradhi (Punjabi), Dakhanadhi (Gujarati Lohana) and Dahre (Sindhi) are sub-groups of the Arora people based on territorial differentiations.

References

Punjabi tribes
Arora clans

2. The glossary of tribes and castes in punjab